The Au Berceau Championnat du Monde event was part of the archery programme at the 1900 Summer Olympics. Qualification for the event was through the individual competitions in the earlier Au Berceau events: Au Chapelet and Au Cordon Doré.

Background

This was the only appearance of the men's Championnat du Monde.

Competition format

Little is known about the format of the competition.

Schedule

Results

References

 De Wael, Herman. Herman's Full Olympians: "Archery 1900". Accessed 24 May 2018.
 

Au Berceau Championnat du Monde